Denise "Dee" Barnes (stage name Sista D) is an American rapper and former Fox television personality who performed in the West Coast hip hop female duo Body & Soul and hosted a radio show on KDAY, prior to gaining wider fame as the host of Fox's hip hop show Pump It Up!, a weekly FOX TV rap music series on air from 1989-1992, according to IMDb. 

On January 27, 1991, she was physically assaulted by Dr. Dre at a rap industry party. Barnes filed charges. Dre pled no contest. Despite being the victim, she was blacklisted from the rap industry. A  public apology came years later but did not account  specifically to the targets of his abuse, including artist Mi'chel'le: "I apologize to the women I've hurt. I deeply regret what I did and know that it has forever impacted all of our lives."
Barnes plans on writing a biography of her life, according to a 2019 VIBE Magazine article.

Biography 
Body & Soul's 1989 debut single "Dance to the Drummer's Beat", released on Los Angeles-based record label, heavily sampled the Herman Kelly and Life song of the same name. Its b-side, "Hi-Powered", was produced by Def Jef. The same year another track produced by Def Jef would be released: "We Can Do This", on the label showcase This Is Delicious – Eat to the Beat. Body & Soul's greatest recording would apparently be their last—as part of the Dr. Dre-produced West Coast Rap All-Stars and their 1990 posse cut, "We're All in the Same Gang", which earned them a Grammy Award nomination.

In 1992, Barnes hosted the hip-hop special Sisters in the Name of Rap, a 75-minute revue of live performances taped at the Ritz in New York. The show featured an all-female line up with such artists as Queen Latifah and MC Lyte.

In 2017, she appeared in the second episode of the TV series The Defiant Ones.

In March 2019, it was reported that Barnes was facing financial difficulties and was "officially homeless". She stated on the Wendy Williams show on April 18, 2019, that she had raised $25,000 from a GoFundMe account.

1991 assault and reactions 
An episode of Pump It Up! combined interviews with N.W.A and Ice Cube, shortly after N.W.A had dissed Ice Cube with their 100 Miles and Runnin' album.  The clips are shown in part in the second episode of The Defiant Ones.  Dee Barnes said in the episode that there was a bad energy in the interview with N.W.A and every answer seemed to involve a diss to Ice Cube.  In production, this was then combined with Barnes's interview with Ice Cube in which he dissed N.W.A and also cruelly mimicked The DOC's voice, shortly after a near-fatal accident.  This caused great offense to Dr. Dre, who was a close friend of The DOC.

On January 27, 1991, Dr. Dre encountered Barnes at a record release party in Hollywood. According to Barnes, he picked her up by her hair and "began slamming her head and the right side of her body repeatedly against a  brick wall near the stairway" as his bodyguard held off the crowd with a gun.  After Dr. Dre tried to throw her down the stairs and failed, he began kicking her in the ribs and hands.  She escaped and ran into the women's restroom.  Dr. Dre followed her and "grabbed her from behind by the hair again and proceeded to punch her in the back of the head".  Finally, Dre and his bodyguard ran from the building.

N.W.A. promoter Doug Young claims that he attempted to intervene to restrain Dr. Dre, but that he was punched in the mouth by Dr. Dre's bodyguard.

The other members of N.W.A. defended Dr. Dre. N.W.A.'s MC Ren later said "bitch deserved it" and DJ Yella echoed with "yeah, bitch had it coming". As Dr. Dre explained the incident: "People talk all this shit, but you know, somebody fuck with me, I'm gonna fuck with them. I just did it, you know. Ain't nothing you can do now by talking about it. Besides, it ain't no big thing—I just threw her through a door." Barnes sued in February 1991, telling reporter Alan Light: "They've grown up with the mentality that it's okay to hit women, especially black women. Now there's a lot of kids listening and thinking it's okay to hit women who get out of line." In February, Barnes filed assault charges and brought a $22.75 million lawsuit against Dr. Dre, who pleaded no contest to the assault. He was fined $2,500, placed on two years' probation, and ordered to perform 240 hours of community service and produce an anti-violence public service announcement.  The lawsuit was settled out of court.

Some others condemned the incident.  Jerry Heller, then manager of N.W.A, called the incident "disgraceful" in his book and said that he was "left to clean up the mess" afterward.  He claimed that Dr. Dre was generally non-violent and that the attack was a result of excess drinking. The New York rapper Tim Dog threatened Dr. Dre on the song Fuck Compton with the lyrics Dre, beating on Dee from Pump It Up / Step to the Dog and get fucked up.

Dr. Dre produced and is featured in rapper Eminem's song "Guilty Conscience", in which Eminem references the incident as a humorous put-down.  Dre reportedly fell out of his chair laughing at it.

In The Defiant Ones, Dre commented on the incident:
... There is absolutely no excuse for it. No woman should ever be treated this way. Any man that puts his hands on a female is a fucking idiot. He is out of his fucking mind and I was out of my fucking mind at the time. I fucked up. I paid for it. I'm sorry for it and I apologized for it. I have this dark cloud that follows me and it's gonna be attached to me forever. It's a major blemish on who I am as a man. And every time it comes up, it just makes me feel fucked up.  So it's just like, what do I do? What do I do to get rid of this dark cloud? I don't know what else to do. I'm learning. I'm trying to become a better person, become a better man. In the end, I've hurt people that I care about. And for that, I'm really sorry.

References

External links 

Dee Barnes YouTube channel

American women rappers
African-American women rappers
American film actresses
Place of birth missing (living people)
Year of birth missing (living people)
Living people
21st-century American rappers
21st-century American women musicians
Domestic violence in the United States
21st-century African-American women
21st-century African-American musicians
21st-century women rappers